Jama Assembly constituency is an assembly constituency in the Indian state of Jharkhand.

Overview
Jama Assembly constituency covers: Jama and Ramgarh Police Stations in Dumka district.

This seat is reserved for Scheduled Tribes.

Jama Assembly constituency is part of Dumka (Lok Sabha constituency).

Members of Legislatiive Assembly 
 1967: M. Hasda, Independent
 1969: Madan Besra, Indian National Congress
 1972: Madan Besra, Indian National Congress
 1977: Madan Besra, Indian National Congress
 1980: Dewan Soren, Jharkhand Mukti Morcha
 1985: Shibu Soren, Jharkhand Mukti Morcha
 1990: Mohril Murmu, Jharkhand Mukti Morcha
 1995: Durga Soren, Jharkhand Mukti Morcha
 2000: Durga Soren, Jharkhand Mukti Morcha
 2005: Sunil Soren, Bharatiya Janata Party.
 2009: Sita Soren, Jharkhand Mukti Morcha
 2014: Sita Soren, Jharkhand Mukti Morcha
 2019: Sita Soren, Jharkhand Mukti Morcha

See also
Jama
Ramgarh
Jharkhand Legislative Assembly
List of states of India by type of legislature

References

Assembly constituencies of Jharkhand